Auriculella malleata is a species of tropical air-breathing land snails, terrestrial pulmonate gastropod mollusks. This species is endemic to the United States (Hawaii).

References

External links
 

Auriculella
Endemic fauna of the United States
Molluscs of Hawaii
Gastropods described in 1904
Taxa named by César Marie Félix Ancey
Taxonomy articles created by Polbot